The Eurasian stone-curlew, Eurasian thick-knee, or simply stone-curlew (Burhinus oedicnemus) is a northern species of the Burhinidae (stone-curlew) bird family.

Taxonomy
The Eurasian stone-curlew was formally described by the Swedish naturalist Carl Linnaeus in 1758 in the tenth edition of his Systema Naturae under the binomial name Charadrius oedicnemus. He specified the locality as England. The name Oedicnemus had been used earlier by the French naturalist Pierre Belon in 1655. The species is now placed in the genus Burhinus that was introduced by the German zoologist Johann Karl Wilhelm Illiger in 1811. The genus name combines the Greek  meaning "ox" with  meaning "nose". The species name oedicnemus combines the Greek  meaning "to swell", and  meaning "shin" or "leg", referring to the bird's prominent tibiotarsal joints, which also give it the common name of "thick-knee". This is an abbreviated form of Thomas Pennant's 1776 coinage "thick-kneed bustard".

The name "stone curlew" was recorded by Francis Willughby in 1678 as a "third sort of Godwit, which in Cornwall they call the Stone-Curlew, differing from the precedent in that it hath a much shorter and slenderer Bill than either of them". It derives from the bird's nocturnal calls sounding like the only distantly related Eurasian curlew Numenius arquata and its preference for barren stony heaths.

Five subspecies are recognised:
 B. o. oedicnemus (Linnaeus, 1758) – west, south Europe to the Balkans, Ukraine and Caucasus
 B. o. distinctus (Bannerman, 1914) – west Canary Islands
 B. o. insularum (Sassi, 1908) – east Canary Islands
 B. o. saharae (Reichenow, 1894) – north Africa and the Mediterranean islands to Iraq and Iran
 B. o. harterti Vaurie, 1963 – west Kazakhstan to Pakistan and northwest India
The Indian stone-curlew Burhinus indicus was previously considered as a subspecies of the Eurasian stone-curlew.

Description
It is a fairly large wader though is mid-sized by the standards of its family. The bird is striking in flight, with black and white wing markings.

Distribution and habitat
The Eurasian stone curlew occurs throughout Europe, north Africa and southwestern Asia. It is a summer migrant in the more temperate European and Asian parts of its range, wintering in Africa. Despite being classed as a wader, this species prefers dry open habitats with some bare ground.

Behaviour and ecology

It is largely nocturnal, particularly when singing its loud wailing songs, which are reminiscent of that of curlews. Food consists of insects and other small invertebrates, and occasionally small reptiles, frogs and rodents.

Breeding
Eurasian stone-curlews probably first breed when they are three years old. The eggs are laid at two day intervals in a scrape on open ground. The clutch normally consists of 2 eggs which are on average . The eggs are pale buff and are variably spotted, streaked or blotched with brown or purple grey. Both sexes incubate the eggs beginning after the last egg is laid. The eggs hatch after 24–26 days. The precocial young leave the nest soon after hatching and are then cared for by both parents for 36–42 days. Normally only a single brood is raised each year but a replacement clutch is laid after the loss of eggs or the loss of small young.

The maximum recorded age recorded from ring-recovery data within the British Isles is 22 years and 4 months for a bird ringed as a nestling in Suffolk in 1990 and caught again in Suffolk in 2012.

Status
Although categorized by the International Union for Conservation of Nature as of Least Concern, some populations are showing declines due to agricultural intensification. For example, a French population has declined with 26% over 14 years.

References

Sources

External links

 
 Ageing and sexing (PDF; 4.7 MB) by Javier Blasco-Zumeta & Gerd-Michael Heinze
 
 
 
 
 

Eurasian stone curlew
Birds of Eurasia
Birds of North Africa
Birds of the Canary Islands
Eurasian stone curlew
Eurasian stone curlew